The Private Life of the Gannets is a 1934 British short documentary film, directed by Julian Huxley, about a colony of Northern Gannets (Morus bassanus) on the small rocky island of Grassholm, off the coast of Wales. It received a special mention at the 3rd Venice International Film Festival in 1935 and won the Best Short Subject (One-Reel) at the 10th Academy Awards in 1938. The title was chosen by producer Alexander Korda as a reference to The Private Life of Henry VIII (1933), his breakthrough film of the previous year.

The "truly landmark film," provides, according to WildFilmHistory, "an absorbing and atmospheric account," by combining "close-up, slow motion and aerial shots." This "groundbreaking footage ... shot with the support of the Royal Navy ... reveals the incredible private lives of these birds as they squabble over territory, perform spectacular dives and regurgitate fish for their young." The production was headed by renowned biologist Julian Huxley, who enlisted "some of the top figures in the British scientific and cinematic world" for what "is classed by many as the world's first natural history documentary, its thorough and academic approach a stark contrast to the expedition format of its predecessors."  "A comprehensive insight into a fascinating creature," it was the first wildlife film to receive an Academy Award.

References

External links

1934 films
1934 documentary films
1934 short films
1930s short documentary films
Black-and-white documentary films
British black-and-white films
British short documentary films
Live Action Short Film Academy Award winners
Documentary films about nature
Documentary films about Wales
Films produced by Alexander Korda
1930s English-language films
1930s British films